Cnemaspis agarwali (Agarwal's day gecko) is a species of diurnal, rock-dwelling, insectivorous gecko endemic to the Eastern Ghats of India. It is distributed in Sankagiri near Salem District of Tamil Nadu.

References

 Cnemaspis agarwali

agarwali
Reptiles of India
Reptiles described in 2019